is a professional Japanese tennis player. On 12 June 2006, he reached his highest ATP singles ranking of No. 261. On 7 May 2018, he achieved his highest doubles ranking of No. 130.

Career

He was the runner-up in men's singles at the Japanese National Championships in 2006 when he lost the final against Satoshi Iwabuchi.

He won 6 Japanese national championship titles in men's doubles category:
4 titles with Satoshi Iwabuchi (2005,2007–09) and 2 titles with Kaito Uesugi (2021-22).

When he played at the 2019 Shenzhen Longhua Open against 18-year-old Chun-hsin Tseng as a lucky loser, it was the largest age difference ever in a Challenger match, with Matsui being the oldest player at 41 years old, with an ATP ranking.  

He represented Japan in three Davis Cup ties between 2006 and 2010, his win–loss record is 4-1. Plus Matsui participated in the first 2 editions of ATP Cup in 2020-2021 as a member of Team Japan. Matsui holds the record as the oldest player in ATP Cup history. He is also currently the oldest active singles player on the ATP world ranking.

Records

Personal life
Based in Kashiwa, Matsui speaks Japanese and English fluently. In 2010, he was married to a former professional tennis player Tomoyo Takagishi, they have 2 children.

Challenger and Futures finals

Singles: 11 (2–9)

Doubles: 44 (21–23)

References

External links
 
 
 
 Official website 
 Official blog 

1978 births
Living people
People from Kashiwa
Sportspeople from Osaka
Japanese male tennis players
Asian Games medalists in tennis
Asian Games silver medalists for Japan
Asian Games bronze medalists for Japan
Medalists at the 2006 Asian Games
Medalists at the 2010 Asian Games
Tennis players at the 2006 Asian Games
Tennis players at the 2010 Asian Games
20th-century Japanese people